John Hunter may refer to:

Politics 
John Hunter (British politician) (1724–1802), British Member of Parliament for Leominster
John Hunter (Canadian politician) (1909–1993), Canadian Liberal MP for Parkdale, 1949–1957
Sir John Hunter (consul-general) (died 1816), British consul-general in Spain
John Hunter (Northern Ireland politician), Ulster unionist member of the Northern Ireland Forum
John Hunter (Royal Navy officer) (1737–1821), Governor of New South Wales
John Hunter (South Carolina politician) (c. 1750–1802), American politician
John Hunter (Westchester County, New York) (1778–1852), New York politician
John F. Hunter (1896–1957), U.S. Representative from Ohio
John W. Hunter (1807–1900), US Congressman from New York
Jon Blair Hunter, West Virginia politician
John Dunn Hunter (1796–1827), leader of the Fredonian Rebellion
John McEwan Hunter (1863–1940), member of the Queensland Legislative Assembly

Sports

Soccer
John Hunter (Third Lanark footballer) (died 1891), Scottish football player
John Hunter (Australian footballer), Scottish-born Australian former footballer and coach
Ian Hunter (Scottish footballer) (born John Hunter, fl. 1960s), Scottish footballer (Falkirk)
John Hunter (Falkirk footballer) (fl. 1920s), Scottish footballer (Falkirk, Reading, Guildford)
John Hunter (footballer, born 1878) (1878–1966), known as 'Sailor', Scottish football player and manager (Motherwell)
Jock Hunter (1875–1950), Scottish footballer

Others
John Hunter (American football), American football player
John Hunter (golfer) (1871–1946), Scottish professional golfer
John Hunter (rower) (born 1943), New Zealand rower
Johnny Hunter (1925–1980), Australian rugby league footballer

Authors and academics 
J. A. Hunter (John Alexander Hunter, 1887–1963), white hunter in Africa, later a writer
John Hunter (scientist) (born 1955), projectile researcher
John Hunter (screenwriter) (born 1911), American award-winning screenwriter
John E. Hunter (1939–2002), American psychologist and statistician
John Hunter (classicist) (1746–1837), joint founder of the Royal Society of Edinburgh

Physicians
John Hunter (surgeon) (1728–1793), surgeon and anatomist
John Hunter (physician) (1754–1809), physician
John Irvine Hunter (1898–1924), Australian anatomist
John D. Hunter (1968–2012), American neurobiologist and creator of matplotlib

Others 
John Kelso Hunter (1802–1873), Scottish portrait painter
John Hart Hunter (1807–1872), college fraternity founder
John Hunter (bishop) (1897–1965), former bishop of Kimberley and Kuruman
John E. L. Hunter (1897–1971), World War I fighter ace
Jackie Hunter (entertainer) (John Hunter, 1903–1951), Canadian entertainer
John Hunter (performer), New Zealand female impersonator
John Hunter (singer), American singer and musician
Sir John Adams Hunter, British colonial administrator
John Oswald Mair Hunter, Lord Hunter, Scottish law lord

See also
Jack Hunter (disambiguation)